The Jondachi tree frog (Hyloscirtus staufferorum) is a species of frogs in the family Hylidae endemic to Ecuador. Its natural habitats are subtropical or tropical moist montane forests and rivers.  Scientists have seen it between 2040 and 2500 meters above sea level. It is threatened by habitat loss.

References

Hyloscirtus
Amphibians of Ecuador
Amphibians described in 1993
Taxonomy articles created by Polbot